Punk's Not Dead may refer to:
 Punks Not Dead, debut album by The Exploited
 Punk's Not Dead (2007 film), a 2007 documentary film
 Punk's Not Dead (2011 film), a 2011 Macedonian film
 P'unk Is Not Dead, album by P'unk-en-Ciel, see Butterfly (L'Arc-en-Ciel album)

See also
 Punks Not Dad, British band
 Punk is dead (disambiguation)